Paul Riley (born 3 October 1951, Islington, London) is an English bassist, singer and record producer. He was a member of Chilli Willi and the Red Hot Peppers and Roogalator in the 1970s.

Biography
His career in music began at the beginning of the 1970s as bass player with various visiting blues artists, notably: Albert Collins, Champion Jack Dupree, Bobby Parker, Lightnin' Slim, Homesick James – and continued through the decade with seminal pub-rockers Chilli Willi and the Red Hot Peppers, Robin Scott, the embryonic Rockpile (as featured on the album Get It), and with guitarist Danny Adler's Roogalator.

By the closing years of the 1970s, he had become involved in record production and (briefly) artist-management, co-managing and producing The Sinceros. 
As the 1970s moved into the 1980s he took over the running of Nick Lowe's 'AMPRO' studio, and was recording full-time – subsequently producing and/or engineering records for Lew Lewis, Carlene Carter, Elvis Costello, Nick Lowe, Johnny Marr, The Anti-Nowhere League, The Ruts, Robert Wyatt, Edwyn Collins, Squeeze, Paul Carrack, Kirsty McColl, Genny Schorr, Tony Riviera Sales and more. 
In 1985, he was invited to join the staff of Demon Records to add some technical understanding and help enable production of the brand-new compact-disc format, to assume responsibility for all mastering issues and to become archivist of the burgeoning tape archive (a legacy of the prodigious output of Elvis Costello, Nick Lowe and all former Riviera Global artists). 
Three years later, he could be found moonlighting on bass with The Tex Pistols (alongside former Chilli Willi drummer Pete Thomas ), and later, in 1992, continued moonlighting activities with The Balham Alligators, playing alongside Geraint Watkins and Bobby Irwin with whom in 1994, he would serve as a member of Nick Lowe's Impossible Birds, his last regular gig as a musician.

He left Demon in 1995, and after the dissolution of the Impossible Birds was co-opted into the business of Malcolm Mills, founder of Proper Records.

References

 Vladimir Bogdanov, Chris Woodstra, All Music Guide to Country: The Definitive Guide to Country Music – Page 143, 2003, Backbeat Books, 
 Peter Buckley, The Rough Guide to Rock – Page 465, 2003, Rough Guides, 

1951 births
Living people
People from Islington (district)
English rhythm and blues musicians
English blues musicians
English bass guitarists
English male guitarists
Male bass guitarists
Musicians from London
English record producers
Chilli Willi and the Red Hot Peppers members